The 1921 Wisconsin Badgers football team was an American football team that represented the University of Wisconsin in the 1921 Big Ten Conference football season. The team compiled a 5–1–1 record (3–1–1 against conference opponents), finished in fourth place in the Big Ten Conference, shut out four of seven opponents, and outscored all opponents by a combined total of 141 to 13. John R. Richards was in his fifth year as Wisconsin's head coach.

Fullback Guy Sundt was the team captain. Halfback Al Elliott was selected as a second-team All-American by Norman E. Brown of the Central Press. Four Wisconsin players received first-team All-Big Ten honors: Al Elliott, end Stevens Gould, center George Bunge, and halfback Rollie Williams.

The team played its home games at Camp Randall Stadium. The stadium's seating capacity was increased from 10,000 to 14,000 prior to the 1921 season. During the 1921 season, the average attendance at home games was 11,962.

Schedule

References

Wisconsin
Wisconsin Badgers football seasons
Wisconsin Badgers football